The River Run Centre is a performing arts centre in Guelph, Ontario, Canada.

Construction of the facility began in 1995 and cost $15 million. It officially opened on October 4, 1997.

Halls 
The facility has three halls:

The Main Hall, which can seat 785
The Co-operators Hall, which seats 225
The Canada Company Hall

References

External links
River Run Centre

Theatres in Ontario
Buildings and structures in Guelph
Tourist attractions in Guelph
Canada
Arts centres in Canada